Jo Jin-woo (born 17 November 1999) is a South Korean footballer who plays as a defender for Daegu FC.

Career statistics

Club

References

1999 births
Living people
Sportspeople from Incheon
South Korean footballers
South Korean expatriate footballers
South Korea under-20 international footballers
South Korea under-23 international footballers
Association football defenders
K League 1 players
Matsumoto Yamaga FC players
Daegu FC players
South Korean expatriate sportspeople in Japan
Expatriate footballers in Japan